The canton of Remire-Montjoly (French: Canton de Remire-Montjoly) is one of the former cantons of the Guyane department in French Guiana. It was located in the arrondissement of Cayenne. Its administrative seat was located in Remire-Montjoly, the canton's sole commune. Its population was 20,689 in 2012.

Administration

References 

Remire-Montjoly